Uppercut is an EP by Canadian singer and songwriter Morgan Finlay.  It was released in 2002.

Track listing
 "Zensong"
 "In a Perfect World"
 "The Reason Why"
 "A Lesson"
 "Flow"
 "Everything Will Work Out Right"

2002 EPs